Gryllefjord is a fishing village in Senja Municipality in Troms og Finnmark county, Norway. It is located on the island of Senja, along the Gryllefjorden in the northern part of the municipality.
 
The Andenes–Gryllefjord Ferry, is a car ferry service that runs during the summer to Andenes on the island of Andøya.

The village was the administrative centre of the old municipality of Torsken which existed until 1 January 2020 when it was merged into Senja Municipality.

There is one nursing home (as of 2021).

References

External links

Villages in Troms
Populated places of Arctic Norway
Senja